The 2006–07 season was the 78th season in the existence of Real Valladolid and the club's third consecutive season in the second division of Spanish football. In addition to the domestic league, Real Valladolid participated in this season's edition of the Copa del Rey. The season covered the period from 1 July 2006 to 30 June 2007.

Competitions

Overall record

Segunda División

League table

Results summary

Results by round

Matches

Copa del Rey

References

Real Valladolid seasons
Valladolid